Kellie Shanygne Williams-Jackson (née Williams; born March 22, 1976) is an American actress. She is best known for her role as Laura Lee Winslow, the middle-born child of Carl and Harriette Winslow on the ABC/CBS television series Family Matters which ran from 1989–1998.

Early life and career
Jackson was born in Washington D.C. as Kellie Shanygne Williams. After Family Matters, she began acting in the ABC television show What About Joan. In 1996, she had a recurring role as Charisse J. Mitchell on the hit UPN sitcom, Moesha, and later Michelle, Nikki's rival, in The Parkers.   In 2006, Williams reunited with her former Family Matters co-star Darius McCrary on the UPN sitcom Eve for two episodes "Separate, But Unequal" and the final cliffhanger episode "Daughter Don't Preach" as Lynn. She was also on the Style Network program Clean House for six episodes in 2009, as a substitute host for Niecy Nash.

In 2007, Jackson created the Kellie Williams Program with co-creator Jeff Rawluk in the Washington, D.C., area. The program will provide Washington, D.C., students between the ages of 14 and 20 an opportunity to produce a television show to air on Comcast Cable Local On-Demand. She stated, "I wanted to create a program similar to the one I grew up with (Howard University Children's Theatre). I wanted to bring it to the masses, not to just people who were familiar with the arts but to people who had never experienced any art."

Personal life 
On September 5, 2009, Williams wed Hannibal Jackson at Ebenezer African Methodist Episcopal Church in Fort Washington, Maryland. The pair met in 2007, through a mutual friend. They have two children together, daughter Hannah Belle Jackson (b. 2010) and son John Ervin Jackson (b. 2012).

Filmography

Film

Television

References

External links
 
 

1976 births
Living people
Actresses from Pasadena, California
20th-century American actresses
21st-century American actresses
Actresses from Washington, D.C.
African-American television personalities
American television actresses
African-American actresses
American child actresses
20th-century African-American women
21st-century African-American women
21st-century African-American people